is a college of technology in Toyama and Imizu, Toyama Prefecture, Japan. In 2014, the school changed the name into National Institute of Technology, Toyama College.
It was formed on 1 October 2009 after a merger between the old  (founded in 1964) in Toyama, and Toyama National College of Maritime Technology (founded in 1906) in Imizu. They are called the Hongo Campus and Imizu Campus respectively.

Courses
The college offers a five-year education program for students who have completed junior high school education.

Departments
The college has six departments, covering engineering, humanities and social sciences, and maritime engineering.

Engineering
 Department of Mechanical Engineering
 Department of Electrical and Control Systems Engineering
 Department of Applied Chemistry and Chemical Engineering
 Department of Electronics and Computer Engineering

Humanities and social sciences
 Department of International Business

Maritime engineering
 Department of Maritime Technology

References

External links
 Toyama National College of Technology

Universities and colleges in Toyama Prefecture
2009 establishments in Japan
Toyama (city)